Danilo Moreira Serrano (born 19 August 1980 in São José), known as just Danilo, is a Brazilian footballer.

External links

1980 births
Living people
Wuhan Guanggu players
Brazilian footballers
Esporte Clube Juventude players
Coritiba Foot Ball Club players
Mirassol Futebol Clube players
Associação Académica de Coimbra – O.A.F. players
Association football defenders
Hapoel Be'er Sheva F.C. players
Expatriate footballers in Israel
Israeli Premier League players
People from São José do Rio Preto
Footballers from São Paulo (state)